Grindslow Knoll is a hill in the Dark Peak area of the Peak District National Park in Derbyshire, England. It is joined to Kinder Scout by a high col though from most angles appears as an independent peak. It is the high point at the western side of Grindsbrook Clough.

Views 
Although the high mass of Kinder Scout blocks views to the north, Grindslow Knoll is an excellent viewpoint stretching over a large portion of the southern Peak District and steep slopes to the Vale of Edale give a great sense of height. There are views of the Nab to the east.

Ascent 
It is most often climbed from Edale, either via a steep and heavily eroded path that climbs 350m in just under a mile, or via the popular Grindsbrook Clough. The summit is also an easy detour from the path along the southern edges of Kinder Scout.

Walking 
The Pennine Way crosses the hill's southern slopes shortly after leaving Edale, climbing to Broadlee Bank Tor before dropping to Upper Booth. This is the start of a very popular walk taking in Jacob's Ladder, Edale Cross, the Woolpacks and either Grindsbrook Clough or Grindslow Knoll.

References 
 Listing at Go4awalk.com

Mountains and hills of Derbyshire
Mountains and hills of the Peak District